Donacoceras is an extinct genus of actively mobile carnivorous cephalopod, essentially a Nautiloid  that lived in what would be North America during the Ordovician from 460.5—443.7 mya, existing for approximately .

Taxonomy
Donacoceras was named by Foerste (1925). It was assigned to Orthocerida by Teichert et al. (1964); and to Endocerida by Sepkoski (2002).

Morphology
The shell is usually long, and may be straight ("orthoconic") or gently curved.  In life, these animals may have been similar to the modern squid, except for the long shell.

Fossil distribution
Fossil distribution is exclusive to Gaspe Peninsula, Quebec, Canada .

References

Cephalopod genera
Ordovician cephalopods
Ordovician cephalopods of North America
Paleozoic life of Quebec